Tray Mountain, with an elevation of  is the seventh-highest peak in Georgia. The boundary line between White and Towns counties bisects the mountain, but leaves the summit in Towns County.  Habersham County lies on a lower part of the mountain, but not on the summit. Tray Mountain is within the borders of the Chattahoochee National Forest and is part of the Tray Mountain Wilderness.  The mountain is referred to by some as the grandstand for viewing the Nantahala Mountains in North Carolina and the rest of the Blue Ridge Mountains in Georgia.  The Appalachian Trail crosses the peak.

The name "Tray" most likely is a corruption of "Trail Mountain", so named for the trails traversing the mountain.

See also
List of mountains in Georgia (U.S. state)

References

External links 
 TopoQuest map of Tray Mountain
 Sherpa Guide to Tray Mountain
 
 Georgia's Named Summits
 100 highest peaks in Georgia
 Georgia peaks over 4,000 feet

Landforms of Habersham County, Georgia
Mountains of Georgia (U.S. state)
Mountains on the Appalachian Trail
Mountains of Towns County, Georgia
Mountains of White County, Georgia
Chattahoochee-Oconee National Forest